Daniel Thomas Turley Murphy (born January 25, 1943) is an American born bishop in the Catholic Church and has been the bishop of the Diocese of Chulucanas in the Piura Region of Peru since 2000.

Biography
Daniel Turley was born in Chicago, Illinois and professed religious vows in the Order of St. Augustine September 4, 1961. He was ordained a Catholic priest on December 21, 1968.  On May 25, 1996 Pope John Paul II named Turley as the coadjutor bishop of the Diocese of Chulucanas. He was ordained a bishop on August 17, 1996, by Bishop Juan Conway McNabb, OSA of Chulucanas. The co-consecrators were Archbishop Fortunato Baldelli the Apostolic Nuncio to Peru and Oscar Rolando Cantuarias Pastor of Piura. He succeeded to the See of Chulucanas upon the resignation of Bishop McNabb on October 28, 2000.

He was elected to the Permanent Council of the Peruvian Bishops' Conference. He was awarded an honorary Doctor of Humane Letters by Villanova University.

See also

Notes

1943 births
Living people
American expatriates in Peru
American Roman Catholic missionaries
Roman Catholic missionaries in Peru
20th-century Roman Catholic bishops in Peru
21st-century Roman Catholic bishops in Peru
Clergy from Chicago
Augustinian friars
American expatriates in Chile
20th-century American clergy
21st-century American clergy
Roman Catholic bishops of Chulucanas